Chembarathi is a Malayalam-language serial broadcasting on Zee Keralam and available digitally on ZEE5. The show stars Thara Kalyan, Amala Girish and Stebin and premiered on November 26, 2018. It is an official remake of Zee Telugu television series Mudda Mandaram and Zee Tamil as Sembaruthi. It ended on 25 March 2022.

Plot
The story is about a rich, strong-willed and stubborn woman, Akhilandeshwari, and her elder son Anand's intense love story with Kalyani, a servant working as a cook. Various problems disrupt their relationship.

Akhilandeshwari (Akhila) arranges Anand's marriage with Priyanka Varma, who is later revealed to be from Thrichambalam's rival family, Nagamadam. Akhila kicks Priyanka out of the marriage hall, which causes her to vow revenge. On the same day, Aravind (Anand's brother) and Nandana's marriage is also arranged. Akhila cancels the marriage, despite Anand's insistence otherwise. Sabari proclaims to Anand that he loves Kalyani, which he denies even though it is true. Then Chandran enters, Vilasini's nephew from Mumbai who is selected as the bride-groom for Kalyani. Das (Kalyani's father), who knows that she loves Anand, makes her promise that she will marry Chandran. Meanwhile, Anand proposes to her. Kalyani, who respects Akhila, decides to perform Satyapramana Vratham, a three-day Hindu penance without food or drink. According to the rules of Vratham, doing this grants the pennant whatever they ask for, but the head of the victim's family (The Thrichamblams) must give a glass of milk to the pennant to finish the vratham. Kalyani requests that her marriage with Chandran continue, which devastates Anand. Vilasini poisons Kalyani's milk, causing her to collapse as Anand confronts her about their break-up.

Soon, Chandran is revealed to be an imposter who has destroyed several women's lives by marrying them and taking them to Mumbai to sell them to sex traffickers. Seeing Chandran and Kalyani's marriage, Priyanka plots to kill Kalyani. She is kidnapped by Priyanka's goon, who leaves her to die in the water tank of Trichambalam. In the morning, Vilasini asks Sujata to turn on the water pump, which causes Kalyani to nearly drown. Fortunately, she is saved by Anand. On the marriage day, a lady named Sophia appears before Chandran and confronts him, to which Chandran responds by knocking her unconscious. At the moment of tying the mangal sutra, Sophia appears and reveals everything, causing the marriage to end.

Kalyani and Anand start to grow closer, and Anand reveals his affection for Kalyani to Akhila. This is when Ganga, Priyanka's younger sister, enters Thrichambalam who is the selected bride for Anand by Akhila. She steals Kalyani's perfectly matching horoscope (with Anand) to gain Akhila's approval. Anand declares in a press-meet that the person who wins 'The Best Brand Ambassador' title will be his wife. Anand secretly makes Kalyani live in his room to practice for the final item: a dance competition. Ganga tries to kill Anand's father but is saved by Kalyani, who catches Ganga. Kalyani wins the Brand Ambassador Title but Ganga threatens to commit suicide unless she is arranged with Anand, forcing Akhila's hand. In turn, Kalyani's marriage is fixed with Neeraj.

Anand, with the help of a Mumbai-based detective Gireesh Menon, learns the truth about Ganga. Gireesh tells Anand to meet in their usual meeting place to hand over Ganga's details. But he has an accident and the file is taken by Prianka's goon. During the night before the wedding, Vilasini kidnaps Aniyankuttan and makes Kalyani write a letter stating that she is leaving the place. Vilasini tells Kalyani to go to a broken house behind the Vilipuram Devi Temple. Vilasini disrobes Kalyani so she can't run away, but Anand rescues her.

Anand marries Kalyani and Ganga and Anand's marriage is cancelled due to a smoke explosion created by Aravind and Subaru. Meanwhile, Neeraj, who is Anand's friend, cancels his wedding with Kalyani.

Vilasini incites doubts in Akhila's mind regarding Kalyani and Anand's relationship. Akhila consults an astrologer who forecasts that Anand's and Kalyani's marriage had taken place. He gives Akhila a letter and asks her to open it the next day at 8:30 am and if what he had written in that letter happens in Trichmbalam then what he said is true.

Priyanka tries to run over Akhila with a car but accidentally hits Kalyani, injuring her leg. The doctors say that Kalyani needs an operation to walk properly. Prianka's ally, Sreenivas, bribes the anesthesiologist, who gives Kalyani an overdose of anaesthesia.

Vilasini makes Akhila once more doubt Kalyani and Anand's relation, though this time Akhila concludes that they both love each other. Anand decides to reveal the truth about Ganga to Akhila. She comes up with a plan, and continues to conduct Anand and Ganga's marriage. She also fixes Kalyani's marriage with Rishikesh, who was Priyanka's ally. On the day of marriage, Anand decides not to go to the auditorium and also tells Kalyani to do so. Das forcefully takes a reluctant Kalyani to the wedding hall. Akhila threatens to kill herself if there is any disruption during the marriage, which creates a quandary for Kalyani. Anand's friend SI Shivadas collects all information regarding Ganga by trapping her as a criminal in a fake car accident and submits all the evidence to prove Ganga's relation with Priyanka. Priyanka and her allies are arrested and the marriages are cancelled. Anand arrives along with his father and rushes to Akhila to disclose his marriage with Kalyani. Akhila is upset upon hearing the news and her worries intensify on seeing Kalyani's Mangala sutra. Akhila attempts suicide but is saved by Anand. Kalyani, blaming herself for all this, unties her mangalya sutra and poisons herself. Through many prayers, she survives.

Kalyani enters the Trichambalam family despite Akhila's disapproval. Eventually, Anand could not take the constant shaming from his mother about his wife, so he resigns from his job as CEO and moves out with Kalyani. On behalf of his father's wish he moves to the outhouse. Das also leaves without telling anyone.

Anand and Kalyani try to start a business but it doesn't go well. Eventually Anand starts a beauty product company. A group of companies decide to call Akhila as their inaugurator without revealing that they are the owners. Priyanka and Ganga plots against Akhila to electrocute her, but Anand manages to save Akhila and is hit by massive current shock in the process. Anand becomes blind due to blow to head. Akhila tries to win her son back but Anand stands with Kalyani. Eventually, Anand regains his vision.

Akhilandshewari's look-alike Rajashewari enters Trichambalam on Priyanka's instruction. Meanwhile Kalyani and Nandana gets pregnant.

Cast

Main
 Amala Gireesan as Kalyani Anand Krishnan
Anand's wife. A young and beautiful village girl, who is employed by Akhilandeshwari as her home cook. Daughter of Das. She is the eldest daughter-in-law of Akiladeshwari and Krishnan. 
 Aishwarya Bhaskar (2018–2020) / Thara Kalyan(2020–2022) Thrichambalath Akhilandeshwari/ Rajaeshwari (dual role)
She is the mother of Anand and Aravind, and Mother-in-law of Kalyani and Nandana, and wife of Krishnan. She is the de facto head of the house.
 Stebin Jacob as Anand Krishnan 
The elder son of Akhilandeshwari and Krishnan. Caring and Lovable Husband of Kalyani.

Recurring
 Prabhin as Aravind Krishnan 
 Thee younger son of Akhilandeshwari and Krishnan and  Husband of Nandana.
 Yavanika Gopalakrishnan as Das 
Kannan and Kalyani's father.
 Sajana Chandran as Krishnan  
 Akhilandeshwari's husband. 
 Blessy Kurien as Nandana Aravind Krishnan
 Aravind's wife and Youngest Daughter-in-law of Akilandeshwari and Krishnan.
Sree Padma as Vilasini 
 She is co-Sister of the Akilandeshwari.
 Neethu Thomas (2018-2020) / Caroline (2020) / Neethu Thomas (2021–present) as Priyanka Varma
 Anand's ex-fiancée
 Haritha Nair as Ganga Varma a.ka. Silky Ganga
 Anand's ex-fiancée 
 Prianka's sister
 Keerthi Gopinath as Subaru 
 Anand's best friend
 Sumi Rashik 
 Jayanthi Rajeev, Vilasini's niece and Rajeev's wife
 Vineeth as Sabari
 Anand's friend
 Arun Mohan as Rajeevan 
Jayanthi's husband
 Regina Sunil as Sujatha, Maid of Thrichambarath house
 Akshay as Aniyankuttan
 Kalyani's younger brother
 Archana Menon as Maheshwari
 Nandana's Mother
 Sini Prasad as Ganga's fake Mother
 Amboori Jayan as Giriraja Varma
 Priyanka's Uncle
 Leela Panicker as Appachiyamma
 Souparnika Subhash as Vyjayanthi
Nandhansenanipuram as anandh krishnans friend

Guest appearance
 Shiju as Ravichandra Varman  (Party episode/ episode 926-927/episode 950)
 Sushmitha Prabhakaran as Sreelakshmi (Party episode/episode 1000)
 Arun G Raghavan as Abhimanyu (Party episode)
 Srinish Aravind as Sudhi (Party episode)

Adaptations

Awards and Nominations

COVID-19 outbreak in India
Due to the COVID-19 pandemic, Chembaruthi and all other Zee Keralam series stopped from 28 March 2020. Months later, filming was permitted again in India. From June 2020, all Zee Keralam programs resumed with fresh episodes. Lead actress Aishwarya Bhaskar was replaced by Thara Kalyan.

References

External links
 Chembarathi at ZEE5
 

2018 Indian television series debuts
2022 Indian television series endings
Malayalam-language television shows
Zee Keralam original programming